Ewald Wenck (28 December 1891 – 3 April 1981) was a German actor. He appeared in more than 230 films and television shows between 1919 and 1978.

Selected filmography

 We Stick Together Through Thick and Thin (1929)
 Spoiling the Game (1932)
 Police Report (1934)
 Holiday From Myself (1934)
 Make Me Happy (1935)
 The Call of the Jungle (1936)
 Family Parade (1936)
 Donogoo Tonka (1936)
 Susanne in the Bath (1936)
 Savoy Hotel 217 (1936)
 Winter in the Woods (1936)
 The Traitor (1936)
 Talking About Jacqueline (1937)
 Meiseken (1937)
 Patriots (1937)
 The Beaver Coat (1937)
 The Roundabouts of Handsome Karl (1938)
 Triad (1938)
 Between the Parents (1938)
 Mistake of the Heart (1939)
 Alarm at Station III (1939)
 Wunschkonzert (1940)
 The Unfaithful Eckehart (1940)
 The Girl at the Reception (1940)
 Counterfeiters (1940)
 The Gasman (1941)
 Riding for Germany (1941)
 What Does Brigitte Want? (1941)
 Alarm (1941)
 The Great Love (1942)
 Two in a Big City (1942)
 We Make Music (1942)
 The Golden Spider (1943)
 A Salzburg Comedy (1943)
 The Crew of the Dora (1943)
 Beloved Darling (1943)
 Melody of a Great City (1943)
 The Green Salon (1944)
 A Wife for Three Days (1944)
 Die Feuerzangenbowle (1944)
 The Woman of My Dreams (1944)
 Somewhere in Berlin (1946)
 No Place for Love (1947)
 Don't Play with Love (1949)
 The Woman from Last Night (1950)
 Torreani (1951)
 Holiday From Myself (1952)
 Pension Schöller (1952)
 Josef the Chaste (1953)
 Knall and Fall as Detectives (1953)
 We'll Talk About Love Later (1953)
 Secretly Still and Quiet (1953)
 Lady's Choice (1953)
 Clivia (1954)
 Son Without a Home (1955)
 Charley's Aunt (1956)
 The Glass Tower (1957) - Portier
 A Thousand Stars Aglitter (1959)
 The Bird Seller (1962)

References

External links
 

1891 births
1981 deaths
20th-century German male actors
German male film actors
Male actors from Berlin
Rundfunk im amerikanischen Sektor people